Kura Bolagh (also Romanized as Kūrā Bolāgh and Kūrābolāgh) is a village in Qarah Quyun-e Jonubi Rural District, Qarah Quyun District, Showt County, West Azerbaijan Province, Iran. At the 2006 census, its population was 408, in 92 families.

References 

Populated places in Showt County